Timotheus Grünthal (or Timoteus Grünthal; 29 June 1893 Hellamaa Parish, Muhumaa – 29 May 1955 Lidingö, Sweden) was an Estonian politician. He was a member of Estonian Constituent Assembly and of the I Riigikogu, representing the Estonian Labour Party.

References

1893 births
1955 deaths
People from Muhu Parish
People from Kreis Ösel
Estonian Labour Party politicians
Members of the Estonian Constituent Assembly
Members of the Riigikogu, 1920–1923
University of Tartu alumni
Recipients of the Order of the White Star, 2nd Class
Estonian World War II refugees
Estonian emigrants to Sweden